The 1993 Brown Bears football team was an American football team that represented Brown University during the 1993 NCAA Division I-AA football season. Brown tied for fourth in the Ivy League. 

In their fourth and final season under head coach Mickey Kwiatkowski, the Bears compiled a 4–6 record and were outscored 267 to 190. Todd Hunter and Walton Smith were the team captains. 

The Bears' 3–4 conference record tied for fourth place in the Ivy League standings. They were outscored 183 to 127 by Ivy opponents. 

Brown played its home games at Brown Stadium in Providence, Rhode Island.

Schedule

References

Brown
Brown Bears football seasons
Brown Bears football